Stewart J. Friesen (born July 25, 1983) is a Canadian-American professional dirt track and stock car racing driver. He competes full-time in the NASCAR Craftsman Truck Series, driving the No. 52 Toyota Tundra for his own team, Halmar Friesen Racing, and part-time at local dirt tracks across New York, Pennsylvania, New Jersey, and elsewhere in the United States, driving the No. 44 car for HFR.

Racing career

Early years

Friesen started racing early in life, his family owning Ransomville Speedway in Western New York. After racing go-karts, Friesen raced big-blocks with widespread success in the Northeast United States, advancing to the 2010 World Finals at Charlotte Motor Speedway. He was the 2012, 2013, 2014, and 2015 Modified track champion at Fonda Speedway.

He was one of the top competitors in the SuperDIRT Series in the mid-2010s, and he also has triumphed in the World of Outlaws sprint car series, winning over 230 career races as of the end of the 2017 season. He has won the Syracuse 200 Modified race four times. Friesen has run over 900 dirt races in his career. Eventually, he met Chris Larsen, who gave Friesen his first NASCAR ride at Eldora Speedway, which was supposed to be a one-time deal. However, the partnership blossomed into a full-time ride.

On occasion, Friesen runs NASCAR and dirt on the same day. He maintains an active presence on New York dirt tracks such as Fonda Speedway and Utica-Rome Speedway.

NASCAR
Breaking into NASCAR with the 2016 Aspen Dental Eldora Dirt Derby, Friesen put his No. 16 Halmar Racing truck into the twelfth starting spot on the grid by virtue of a second-place finish in his heat. However, contact with Caleb Holman ruined his night, and Friesen's debut race resulted in a 28th-place finish. Running five more races in the season, Friesen recorded three top 20 finishes, the best being a 13th at New Hampshire Motor Speedway.

On January 9, 2017, Friesen announced that he would run the full 2017 season in the Halmar Friesen Racing (HFR) No. 52 truck with Tommy Baldwin Jr. coming on as a team manager. In June, following the first seven races of the season, HFR announced it would undergo a two-week hiatus before returning at Kentucky Speedway in July. At Eldora, Friesen qualified on the pole position and remained in the place for the start of the feature after winning his heat race. He led more than half the laps and claimed the victory in the second stage but lost the lead to Matt Crafton in the closing laps, finishing a then-career-best second. About a month after Eldora run, the team took another two-race break while severing its relationship with Baldwin and making a new technical alliance with GMS Racing. After returning to competition, Friesen scored four finishes of seventh or better in the season's last six races, climbing to fourteenth in the season-ending points tally.

For 2018, HFR continued the alliance with GMS, so much so that GMS driver Johnny Sauter referenced Friesen as a teammate. After advancing to the playoffs and a best finish of second on three occasions throughout the year, he finished seventh in the final points standings after being eliminated in the Round of 8.

Friesen remained at HFR in an alliance with GMS for the third straight year in 2019. He was also contacted by JR Motorsports to run a partial schedule in the NASCAR Xfinity Series, but nothing came of it. At Kansas Speedway, Friesen led both practices, won both Stage One and Stage Two and led the most laps, but ran out of fuel with three laps to go due to a pit communication on the previous pit stop, in which the fuelman did not put enough fuel in the truck, handing the win to Ross Chastain and relegating Friesen to 15th, furthering a streak of near-misses for Friesen. On August 1, 2019, Friesen won his first career NASCAR Gander Outdoors Truck Series race at Eldora. On November 8, Friesen achieved his second career victory and his first on a paved track by winning at Phoenix after passing Brandon Jones with four laps remaining. As a result, Friesen qualified for the Championship 4 for the first time but ultimately finished 11th at Homestead and fourth in the final standings.

After missing the playoffs in 2020, Friesen later abandoned a full-time Truck schedule and skipped a race at Kansas Speedway in order to run the Short Track Super Series at Port Royal Speedway. On the night of the Kansas truck event, Friesen finished second to Mat Williamson in a $53,000-to-win race at Port Royal.

Friesen returned with his No. 52 team to the Truck Series full-time in 2021, and despite having a worse season and missing the playoffs in 2020, HFR remained with Toyota. Later in the year, Friesen would make his debut in the NASCAR Cup Series, driving the No. 77 for Spire Motorsports in the series' new dirt race at Bristol. Despite driving a Toyota in the Truck Series, Friesen drove for Spire, a Chevrolet team, in this one race. He finished 23rd, one lap down. Despite not winning a Truck race for the second straight season, Friesen made the Playoffs, scored his best of 2nd in the season finale at Phoenix, and finished sixth in the final standings.

On May 20, 2022, Friesen broke a 54-race winless streak in the Truck Series by scoring his third career victory at Texas after passing Christian Eckes for the lead in Overtime.

Personal life
Friesen grew up in Niagara-on-the-Lake, Ontario, and played hockey as a child. He attended the University of Windsor, attaining a degree in science.

Friesen is married to Jessica Friesen (née Zemken). The two have one son. Friesen and his wife also run a t-shirt printing business (One-Zee Tees), which was originally a fallback plan in case racing did not work out.
They live in Sprakers, New York. Like her husband, Jessica also is a dirt racing driver and she attempted to make her Truck Series debut in a second HFR truck, the No. 62, at the Bristol dirt race in 2021. However, she failed to qualify after the qualifying heat races were canceled due to rain.

Motorsports career results

NASCAR
(key) (Bold – Pole position awarded by qualifying time. Italics – Pole position earned by points standings or practice time. * – Most laps led. Small number below track name denotes finishing position.)

Cup Series

Craftsman Truck Series

 Season still in progress
 Ineligible for series points

References

External links

 
 

Racing drivers from Ontario
1983 births
Living people
NASCAR drivers
People from Niagara-on-the-Lake
Racing drivers from New York (state)